Ščuka is a surname. Notable people with the surname include:

 Luka Ščuka (born 2002), Slovenian basketball player
 Viljem Ščuka (born 1938), Slovenian psychotherapist

See also
 

Slovene-language surnames